Pedro Augusto Ferreira Soares (born 28 October 1993) is a Portuguese professional footballer who plays as a forward for Vitória Guimarães B.

Professional career
On 1 August 2019, Soares signed a professional contract with Aves. Soares made his professional debut with Aves in a 2-0 Primeira Liga loss to C.D. Tondela on 11 June 2020.

On 24 August 2021, he joined Vitória Guimarães B on a two-year deal.

References

External links
 
 ZeroZero Profile
 Aves Profile

1999 births
Living people
People from Penafiel
Portuguese footballers
Association football forwards
Leixões S.C. players
S.L. Benfica B players
C.D. Aves players
F.C. Penafiel players
Vitória S.C. B players
Primeira Liga players
Liga Portugal 2 players
Sportspeople from Porto District